The Association des Scouts et Guides du Sénégal (SGdS, Scout and Guide Association of Senegal) is one of Senegal's Scouting and Guiding organizations. Its Scout section is member of the World Organization of the Scout Movement via the Confédération Sénégalaise du Scoutisme. The Guide section is a direct and full member of the World Association of Girl Guides and Girl Scouts since 1981.

The coeducational association founded in 1953 serves about 19,000 members; the Guide section has 4,093 members (as of 2003).  The word "scouts" refers to boys, and the word "guides" refers to girls.

Emblems
 

The emblem of the Association des Scouts et Guides du Sénégal incorporates elements from the badges from Guides and the Scouts: the tree from the coat of arms of Senegal, a Fleur-de-lis on top of a trefoil, a cross and on the banner SGDS.

External links
 official website
 official website Scouts du Sénégal

World Association of Girl Guides and Girl Scouts member organizations
World Organization of the Scout Movement member organizations
Scouting and Guiding in Senegal
Youth organizations established in 1953